Dak-kkochi ("chicken skewer") is a popular South Korean street food consisting of small pieces of chicken and scallions grilled on a skewer.

Dak (chicken) is the most popular type of kkochi (skewered food). Others include sausages, fish cakes, and short rib patties called tteok-galbi. The menu is basically charcoal-grilled Dak-kkochis and spicy seasoned Dak-kkochis.

Etymology 
Dak means chicken, and kkochi means food on skewers or skewers themselves used for culinary purposes.

See also 
 Jūjeh kabāb
 Shish taouk
 Yakitori
 List of chicken dishes

References 

Grilled skewers
Korean chicken dishes
Street food in South Korea